Events in the year 2022 in the Dominican Republic.

Incumbents 

 President: Luis Abinader
 Vice President: Raquel Peña de Antuña

Events 
Ongoing: COVID-19 pandemic in the Dominican Republic

 February 17 – The Dominican Republic ends all COVID-19-related public health measures, including mask wearing mandates and use of vaccine passes in order to enter public places, despite not reaching 70% of its vaccination target.
 May 3 – Carlos Guillén Tatis, the agriculture counselor at the Dominican Republic's embassy in Haiti, is kidnapped in Croix-des-Bouquets, Haiti.
 June 6 – Orlando Jorge Mera, the Environmental Minister for the Dominican Republic and son of former President Salvador Jorge Blanco, is shot dead in his office. The perpetrator was identified by a presidential spokesman as Miguel Cruz, a childhood friend of the minister. He was later taken into custody.
 July 7 - The Dominican Republic reports its first case of monkeypox.

Deaths 

 January 22 – Agripino Núñez Collado, 88, Roman Catholic clergyman.
 March 7 –  Ramón Báez Romano, 93, golfer and politician.
 March 10 – Odalis Pérez, 44, baseball player.
 March 21 – Rosa Gómez de Mejía, 82, former first lady.
 June 6 – Orlando Jorge Mera, 55, lawyer and politician.
 June 16 – Ivonne Haza, 83, operatic soprano.
 July 3 – Idelisa Bonnelly, 90, marine biologist.
 July 23 – Julio Valdez, 66, baseball player.

See also 

COVID-19 pandemic in the Dominican Republic
2022 Atlantic hurricane season

References

External links 

 
2020s in the Dominican Republic
Years of the 21st century in the Dominican Republic
Dominican Republic
Dominican Republic